The 2012 European Short Course Swimming Championships was held in Chartres, France, from November 22 to 25, 2012.

The event was held over four days with heats, semifinals and a final for the 50 m and 100 m events and heats and a final for all other events with the exception of the women's 800 m and men's 1500 m freestyle which are heat declared winners. Heats were held in the morning, with semifinals, finals and the fastest heat of the distance freestyle events in the evening.

Each nation was permitted to enter four swimmers into each individual event, however only the fastest two were able to progress to the semifinal and/or final.

Medal summary

Men's events

Legend: WR - World record; WBT - World best time; ER - European record; NR - National record; CR - Championship record
 Swimmers who participated in the heats only and received medals.

Women's events

Legend: WR - World record; WBT - World best time; ER - European record; NR - National record; CR - Championship record
 Swimmers who participated in the heats only and received medals.

Mixed events

 Swimmers who participated in the heats only and received medals.

Medal table

References

External links 
Official website
Results book

European Short Course Swimming Championships
European Short Course Swimming Championships
2012
Swimming
November 2012 sports events in France
International aquatics competitions hosted by France